Paul Tournon (b. 19 February 1881 - 22 December 1964) was a French architect. He was born in Marseille  and died in Paris.

He was an architect in chief of many French civil buildings and national palaces, and a member of the Académie des Beaux-Arts.

He is known for his reinforced concrete religious buildings such as the Église Sainte-Thérèse-de-l'Enfant-Jésus in Élisabethville (Yvelines), with extensive sculptural work by sculptor Carlo Sarrabezolles. Also, Tournon designed the Église du Saint-Esprit in Paris, Cathédrale du Sacré-Cœur in Casablanca and several churches in Morocco.

Tournon was the son-in-law of Édouard Branly, the husband of Élisabeth Branly, painter, and the father of two girls, Florence Tournon-Branly, author of stained glasses, and Marion Tournon-Branly, architect and professor at the École Nationale Supérieure des Beaux-Arts and the Fontainebleau Schools.

References and notes
Much of the content of this article comes from the equivalent French-language Wikipedia article, accessed February 14, 2007.

1881 births
1964 deaths
Members of the Académie des beaux-arts
20th-century French architects
Architects of Roman Catholic churches
Burials at Père Lachaise Cemetery
Architects from Marseille